Aviadenoviruses are adenoviruses that affect birds—particularly chickens, ducks, geese, turkeys and pheasants. There are 15 species in this genus. Viruses in this genus cause specific disease syndromes such as Quail Bronchitis (QB), Egg Drop Syndrome (EDS), Haemorrhagic Enteritis (HE), Pheasant Marble Spleen Disease (MSD), and Inclusion Body Hepatitis (IBH). Avian adenoviruses have a worldwide distribution and it is common to find multiple species on a single farm. The most common serogroups are serogroup 1, 2 and 3.

Transmission 
No evidence of transmission from birds to humans has been identified. The virus is mainly spread horizontally by the oro-fecal route, but vertical transmission can occur in serogroup 1. Once it has infected the bird the virus may remain latent until a period of stress, when it may then cause clinical disease.

Clinical signs and diagnosis
Infections are normally subclinical, however clinical disease can occur—especially in young birds as maternal antibody levels begin to wane.

Clinical signs are related to the organ affected.

Signs of gastrointestinal disease (Haemorrhagic Enteritis) include diarrhea, anorexia, melena and hematochezia. Anaemia and dehydration may develop secondary to this haemorrhagic enteritis. Signs of reproductive disease (Egg Drop Syndrome) include low egg production/hatching and the laying of abnormal eggs (size, shape, colour, texture). Adenovirus infection may infect other organs, causing splenitis, inclusion body hepatitis, bronchitis, pulmonary congestion ventriculitis, pancreatitis, or oedema, depending on the species of bird infected.

Diagnosis of aviadenovirus is by histopathology, electron microscopy, viral isolation, ELISA and PCR. In addition, virus antigen can be detected double immunodiffusion. Postmortem examination may reveal a variety of clinical signs relating directly to the organ affected. Specifically, Egg Drop Syndrome can be diagnosed by hemagglutinin inhibition and the virus causes haemagglutination in chickens and ducks.

Treatment and control
Vaccines for HE and EDS are available (ATCvet codes:  for the inactivated vaccine,  for the live vaccine, plus various combinations). Disease incidence may be reduced by minimising stress levels, using appropriate hygiene measures and providing adequate nutrition.

Taxonomy
Aviadenovirus contains the following species:
Duck aviadenovirus B
Falcon aviadenovirus A
Fowl aviadenovirus A
Fowl aviadenovirus B
Fowl aviadenovirus C
Fowl aviadenovirus D
Fowl aviadenovirus E
Goose aviadenovirus A
Pigeon aviadenovirus A
Pigeon aviadenovirus B
Psittacine aviadenovirus B
Psittacine aviadenovirus C
Turkey aviadenovirus B
Turkey aviadenovirus C
Turkey aviadenovirus D

Structure
Viruses in Aviadenovirus are non-enveloped, with icosahedral geometries, and T=25 symmetry. The diameter is around 90 nm. Genomes are linear and non-segmented, around 35–36kb in length and have a guanine/cytosine content of 53–59%. The genome codes for 40 proteins.

Life cycle
Viral replication is nuclear. Entry into the host cell is achieved by attachment of the viral fiber glycoproteins to host receptors, which mediates endocytosis. Replication follows the DNA strand displacement model. DNA-templated transcription, with some alternative splicing mechanism is the method of transcription. The virus exits the host cell by nuclear envelope breakdown, viroporins, and lysis. Birds serve as the natural host.

References

Avian Adenoviruses, reviewed and published by WikiVet at http://en.wikivet.net/Avian_Adenoviruses, accessed 18/08/2011.

External links
Adenovirus Taxonomy 2005
Diagnosis of Adenovirus Infections in Psittacine Birds by DNA in situ Hybridization
 Viralzone: Aviadenovirus
 ICTV

Adenoviridae
Animal viral diseases
Bird diseases
Poultry diseases